Hans Rameau (1901 – 1980) was a German screenwriter. Having established himself in the German film industry he left the country following the Nazi Party's taking of power in 1933. He spent time in several other countries, including Austria and Britain before moving to Hollywood. He returned to Europe in 1951.

Selected filmography
 Jettatore (1919)
 The Pink Diamond (1926)
 My Friend Harry (1928)
 At Ruedesheimer Castle There Is a Lime Tree (1928)
 The Criminal of the Century (1928)
 Yacht of the Seven Sins (1928)
 The Insurmountable (1928)
 Tempo! Tempo! (1929)
 The Tsarevich (1929)
 His Best Friend (1929)
 Scandal in Baden-Baden (1929)
 The Love of the Brothers Rott (1929)
 Achtung! – Auto-Diebe! (1930)
 Him or Me (1930)
The Citadel of Warsaw (1930)
 The Woman They Talk About (1931)
 Bobby Gets Going (1931)
 Madame Pompadour (1931)
 Jumping Into the Abyss (1933)
 Manolescu, Prince of Thieves (1933)
 The World Without a Mask (1934)
 The Grand Duke's Finances (1934)
 A Night of Change (1935)
 Miracle of Flight (1935)
 But It's Nothing Serious (1936)
 His Best Friend (1937)
 Confession (1937)
 Waterloo Bridge (1940)
 Maria Theresa (1951)
 All Clues Lead to Berlin (1952)
 It Was Always So Nice With You (1954)
 The Little Czar (1954)
 Munchhausen in Africa (1958)

References

Bibliography
 Hardt, Ursula. From Caligari to California: Erich Pommer's life in the International Film Wars. Berghahn Books, 1996.

External links

1901 births
1980 deaths
German male screenwriters
Film people from Berlin
Emigrants from Nazi Germany to the United States
20th-century German screenwriters